Highlands is the ninth album by the Christian rock band White Heart and the band's last album with Star Song Records. The album was released and just coming off the singles that were from their Grammy nominated album Tales of Wonder (1992) as well as touring. Highlands was produced by White Heart founders Mark Gersmehl and Billy Smiley with Darrell A. Harris as executive producer. The first radio single "Once and for All" topped the Christian CHR/Pop chart and features members of the 1990's female Christian rock group Rachel Rachel near towards the end of the song. A music video was made for the album's third radio single "Heaven of My Heart". The album peaked at number 4 on the Billboard Top Christian Albums chart.

Track listing
All songs written by Mark Gersmehl and Billy Smiley, except where noted.

 "You Can See the World" – 4:21
 "Nothing But the Best" (Sallee, Wooten, Smiley, Gersmehl) – 3:42
 "Heaven of My Heart" – 6:11	
 "Once and for All" – 5:04
 "Excuse Me, Forgive Me" – 4:17
 "Change the Way" – 4:50
 "Highland of Love" – 5:04
 "The Cry" – 5:30 
 "Let My People Go" (Sallee, Wooten, Smiley, Gersmehl) – 5:22
 "The Flame Passes On" – 4:09

Personnel 

White Heart
 Rick Florian – lead vocals, backing vocals
 Mark Gersmehl – keyboards, percussion, recorder, lead vocals, backing vocals
 Billy Smiley – rhythm guitar, acoustic guitar, octave acoustic guitar, backing vocals
 Brian Wooten – rhythm and lead guitars
 Anthony Sallee – bass
 Jon Knox – drums, percussion

Additional musicians
 Eric Darken – bass drum (4, 10), congas (4, 10), tambourine (4, 10)

Production 
 Darrell A. Harris – executive producer 
 Mark Gersmehl – producer, track and vocal arrangements 
 Billy Smiley – producer, track and vocal arrangements 
 Richie Biggs – track recording (1, 2, 7), mixing (1, 2, 7)
 Bill Deaton – track recording (3), mixing (3-6, 9)
 Jeff Balding – track recording (4, 5, 8, 10)
 Ronnie Brookshire – track recording (6, 9), mixing (8, 10)
 Lee Groitzsch – second engineer
 Patrick Kelly – second engineer
 Shawn McLean – second engineer
 Todd Robbins – second engineer
 Bob Ludwig – mastering
 Toni Thigpen – art direction
 The Riordon Design Group, Inc. – design
 Mark Tucker – band photography
 Shin Sugino – cover photography
 David White – castle photography

Studios
 The Bennett House, Franklin, Tennessee – recording location
 Quad Studios, Nashville, Tennessee – recording location
 The Boardroom, Nashville, Tennessee – recording location
 OmniSound and The Battery, Nashville, Tennessee – mixing locations
 Mastered at Gateway Mastering (Portland, Maine).

Critical reception 
Thom Granger of AllMusic praised Highlands saying that it was "another artistic high-water mark for the band, which now includes Adam Again member John Knox on drums. The influence of '70s prog rockers like Yes and Kansas is interwoven with Celtic themes for a Christian rock classic."

David Cranson of Cross Rhythms said that "after years of personnel changes and so-so albums that languished in the shadows of Petra, three GREAT albums have emerged for White Heart, each seemingly topping the last until with last year's 'Tales Of Wonder' many critics were tossing around the phrase 'classic'. Now comes this, another superlative set of classy AOR cuts ranging from blues based rockers like 'Point Of No Return' to the haunting title track 'Highland of Love.' Lyrically White Heart are good, structurally they're repetitive. But that's a very personal view. If you have any of their previous albums, I reckon you'll like this."

Charts

Radio singles

References

1993 albums
White Heart albums